Christian Perez may refer to:

 Christian Perez (footballer, born 1963), French football forward
 Christian Pérez (footballer, born 1990), Mexican football centre-back
 Christian Pérez (Uruguayan footballer) (born 1990), Uruguayan football midfielder
 Christian Perez (darts player) (born 1982), Filipino darts player
 Christian Jaymar Perez (born 1993), Filipino basketball player